The Road Traffic Act 1988 (c. 52) is an Act of the Parliament of the United Kingdom, concerning licensing of vehicles, insurance and road regulation.

Contents
Part I contains a number of traffic offences including causing death by dangerous driving, driving under the influence of alcohol or drugs (including police powers to arrest, administer tests, etc.), as well as requirements to wear seat belts and motorcycle helmets.

Part II is concerned with regulating the construction and use of motor vehicles, and includes powers to test, inspect and prohibit vehicles that do not meet standards.

Part III sets out the law on driving tests, the requirements for issuing driving licences, and the process for disqualifying drivers.

Part IV deals with the licences required for driving large goods vehicles and passenger-carrying vehicles (buses and coaches).

Part V concerns the registration, licensing and examination of driving instructors.

Part VI contains provisions concerning compulsory vehicle insurance against third-party risks.

Part VII contains miscellaneous provisions.

See also
Road Traffic Act 1930
Road Traffic Regulation Act 1984

External links 

 Full text of legislation on legislation.gov.uk

United Kingdom Acts of Parliament 1988
History of transport in the United Kingdom
Transport legislation
1988 in transport
English tort law